Charles Amos McFarland (March 13, 1875 – December 14, 1924) was a pitcher in Major League Baseball. He pitched for the St. Louis Cardinals, Pittsburgh Pirates and Brooklyn Superbas from 1902 to 1906. McFarland retired with a 3.35 earned run average (ERA), but he played on teams with poor hitting, leaving him with a 34-61 win–loss record. He became a prominent movie theater manager in Texas after his playing career ended.

Early life
Born in White Hall, Illinois, McFarland attended White Hall High School and Illinois College. He had a brother, Monte McFarland, who also played major-league baseball.

Career
In McFarland's first major-league season (1902), he made only two appearances for the Cardinals. Between 1903 and 1905, McFarland came close to 20-loss seasons each year; he finished 9-19, 14-18, and 8-18, despite ERAs of 3.07, 3.21 and 3.81. McFarland's last major-league season was 1906, and he played for three teams - the Cardinals, the Pittsburgh Pirates and the Brooklyn Superbas. He made appearances in the minor leagues through 1909.

After McFarland's baseball career, he opened the first vaudeville theater in Houston and then worked for Interstate Amusement in Fort Worth. He came back to Houston and managed three movie theaters in that city for Southern Enterprises, Inc. McFarland was part of a group that nearly bought the minor-league Houston Buffaloes in 1908, but the deal was never finalized. As a theater manager in Houston, McFarland sometimes irritated the Houston Board of Censors; he continued to show Fatty Arbuckle films after the filmmaker became embroiled in controversy, and he showed the film Don't Call It Love despite a controversial kiss.

Death
McFarland died suddenly on the golf course at the River Oaks Country Club in Houston in 1924. An Associated Press obituary described him as a movie theater manager but did not mention his baseball career.

References

External links

1875 births
1924 deaths
Baseball players from Illinois
Major League Baseball pitchers
Brooklyn Superbas players
St. Louis Cardinals players
Pittsburgh Pirates players
Dubuque Tigers players
Syracuse Stars (minor league baseball) players
Albany Senators players
Des Moines Hawkeyes players
Cedar Rapids Rabbitts players
Oklahoma City Mets players
Houston Buffaloes managers
Houston Buffaloes players
Oklahoma City Indians players
People from White Hall, Illinois